Ludwig Friedrich Barthel (12 June 1898, in Marktbreit – 14 February 1962, in Munich) was a German writer.

Barthel served in the First World War and was a student in Munich.  He was later an archivist there.  His poems, for example "Tannenburg: Ruf und Requiem" (Tannenberg: A Call and a Requiem; 1934), and such stories as "Das Leben ruft" (Life Calls; 1935), are influenced by the experience of war, which he made into a cult.  Because of such tendencies, he venerated Nazism, which he celebrated in such extravagant hymns as "Dom aller Deutschen" (The Cathedral of All Germans; 1938).

Barthel also edited the letters of his friend Rudolf Binding (1957).

References

Bibliography
Christian Zentner, Friedemann Bedürftig (1991). The Encyclopedia of the Third Reich.  Macmillan, New York. 

1898 births
1962 deaths
People from Marktbreit
People from the Kingdom of Bavaria

Writers from Bavaria
German military personnel of World War I
German male writers